Racing Club may refer to:

Football 
 K.R.C. Genk, Belgium
 Racing Club Bafoussam, Cameroon
 Racing Club Beirut, Lebanon
 Racing Club de Avellaneda, Argentina
 Racing Club Haïtien, Haiti
 Racing Club Portuense, Spain
 Racing Club Warwick F.C., England
 Racing de Ferrol, Spain
 Racing de Madrid, Spain
 Racing de Montevideo, Uruguay
 Racing de Olavarría, Argentina
 Racing de Santander, Spain
 Racing de Trelew, Argentina
 Racing FC Union Luxembourg, Luxembourg
 Racing Louisville FC, United States
 RC Lens, France
 Racing Club de Lens Féminin, France
 RC Strasbourg, France
 RCF Paris, France

Rugby union
 Racing 92, the successor club to the rugby union section of Racing Club de France
 RC Narbonne, France